Sop saudara is an Indonesian beef soup or buffalo soup specialty of Makassar city, South Sulawesi. The soup is commonly served with steamed rice and ikan bolu bakar (grilled milkfish).

Ingredients
Sop saudara is a richly spiced soup contains bits of beef or buffalo meat and its offals (usually fried cow's lungs), rice vermicelli, perkedel (fried potato patty) and hard boiled egg. The soup is made of rich beef stock, spiced with a mixture of spices. The spices includes garlic, shallot, candlenut, coriander, caraway, ginger, galangal, lime leaf, lemongrass, nutmeg and cinnamon. Garnishing include chopped scallion and bawang goreng (crispy fried shallot).

Origin
Sop saudara was created by Haji Dollahi, he was working for Haji Subair, a famous Coto Makassar traditional meat soup seller in Makassar circa 1950s. Both men hailed from a town in Pangkajene Islands Regency (Pangkajene Kepulauan or Pangkep) and made their business in selling traditional meat soup.

After three years working for Haji Subair, Haji Dollahi decided to establish his own business in 1957. His first stall was located in Karebosi area, Makassar. The name "sop saudara" which means "brotherly soup" was inspired from the name coto paraikatte (the name of warung that sells Coto Makassar). In Makassar dialect, paraikatte means "relative", "fellow" or "kin", thus Haji Dollahi wished the soup will promote a brotherly sentiment with his customers.

See also

 Coto Makassar
Konro, Bugis-Makassar spicy cow's ribs soup, similar or related to ribs soto
 List of Indonesian soups
 List of soups

References 

Indonesian soups
Makassar cuisine